Phil or Philip Ball may refer to:

 Phil Ball (writer) (born 1957), British writer based in Spain
 Phil Ball (baseball) (1864–1932), owner of the St. Louis Terriers
 Philip Ball (born 1962), English science writer
 Phil Ball (American football) (1925–2008), college football coach